Decade 1994–2004 is the 10-year career anniversary double disc greatest hits album of rapper AZ. It featured his landmark songs from all of his previous albums, along with a number of B-Sides, remixes, and unreleased tracks. It also featured some of AZ's best guest appearances.

Track listing

2004 greatest hits albums
AZ (rapper) albums
Albums produced by Dr. Dre